Chiúre District is a district of Cabo Delgado Province in northern Mozambique. It covers 5,439 km² with 248,381 inhabitants.

The district is divided into six administrative posts, which include the following localities:
 Posto Administrativo de Chiúre:
 Chiúre (Vila),
 Jonga, e
 Milamba
 Posto Administrativo de Chiúre-Velho:
 Micolene, e
 Salave,
 Posto Administrativo de Katapua:
 Meculane
 Posto Administrativo de Mazeze:
 Juravo,
 Mazeze, e
 Murocue
 Posto Administrativo de Namogelia:
 Bilibiza
 Posto Administrativo de Ocua:
 Marera,
 Ocua, e
 Samora Machel

External links
District profile 

Districts in Cabo Delgado Province